Cesare Mauro Trebbi (1847–1931), also known as Mauro Cesare Trebbi, was an Italian painter and lithographer best known for his historico-religious set pieces and especially valued for his figure painting. He worked principally on large-scale public compositions for religious buildings. His frescoes are to be found in many churches in Emilia-Romagna. He was born and died in Bologna.

Selected works 
 Bologna Cathedral: paintings inside the cupola of Saint Anne in Glory
 Church of Saints Simon and Jude in Rubizzano, a frazione of San Pietro in Casale, has canvases by Trebbi and by Alessandro Guardassoni
 Church of San Pietro in Castello d'Argile: figures inside the cupola, in collaboration with the painter Antonio Mosca and the decorator Francesco Fabbri
 Church of Santa Maria del Carmine, Galliera: the decorations of the nave are by Trebbi in collaboration with the church decorator Pompeo Fortini

References 

19th-century Italian painters
Italian male painters
20th-century Italian painters
1847 births
1931 deaths
Italian lithographers
Painters from Bologna
19th-century Italian male artists
20th-century Italian male artists
20th-century lithographers